Akhmetovo (Äxmät) is a rural locality (a village) in Tukayevsky Selsoviet, Aurgazinsky District, Bashkortostan, Russia. The population was 38 as of 2010. There is 1 street.

Geography 
Akhmetovo is located 29 km north of Tolbazy (the district's administrative centre) by road. Staraya Ivanovka is the nearest rural locality.

References 

Rural localities in Aurgazinsky District